Mordellistena fageli is a beetle in the genus Mordellistena of the family Mordellidae. It was described in 1970 by Ermisch.

References

fageli
Beetles described in 1970